The 146th Rifle Division was formed for the first time as a standard Red Army rifle division in mid-1939, as part of a major build-up of the Army prior to the start of World War II. After the start of the German invasion in 1941 it defended the approaches to Kiev for several months until being surrounded and destroyed in September. A second formation began in January 1942, and the new division spent the following year on a relatively quiet sector before joining the offensives that would drive the German invaders from north-central Russia, Lithuania, and Poland. The 146th ended the war fighting in the streets of Berlin, after compiling an enviable record of service, and saw postwar duty in the Group of Soviet Forces in Germany.

1st Formation 
The first 146th Rifle Division began forming on August 16, 1939, at Berdichev in the Ukrainian Military District. Its order of battle was as follows:
 512th Rifle Regiment
 608th Rifle Regiment
 698th Rifle Regiment
 280th Light Artillery Regiment
 717th Howitzer Regiment
 211th Antitank Battalion
 476th Antiaircraft Battalion
 126th Reconnaissance Battalion
 119th Sapper Battalion
 226th Signal Battalion
In September the division took part in the occupation of eastern Poland, and in 1940 in the similar operation in Bessarabia.

On June 22, 1941, the division was in reserve in 36th Rifle Corps, away from the border, but by the evening of the 23rd it had moved up to Tereshki, and by the 27th it was operating alongside the 14th Cavalry Division, defending the Krements area against German tanks and motorized infantry. By the end of June it had been assigned to 6th Army in Southwestern Front. On June 29 the Front commander, Col. Gen. M. P. Kirponos, criticized the performance of 36th Corps, stating in part:In late July the division was reassigned to 26th Army, and in August to 37th Army, fighting in the defense lines on the direct northern approaches to Kiev. This position gave the men and women of the 146th virtually no hope of escape from the German encirclement, and the division was destroyed in September, although not officially removed from the Soviet order of battle until December 27.

2nd Formation 
The second 146th Rifle Division officially began forming on January 19, 1942, in the Moscow Military District, based on the 1st formation of the 416th Rifle Division. The new division also incorporated the provisional 468th Rifle Division, which had begun forming in December at Kagami in the Central Asian Military District, presumably with a large number of Kazakh or Uzbek recruits. The amalgamation of these two bodies took place at Venyov in January. The order of battle remained the same as the 1st formation, except the 280th became a standard, rather than a light, artillery regiment, the howitzer regiment and antiaircraft battalion were gone, and the sapper battalion was renumbered as the 149th.

The new division remained in Moscow District in February, then moved to the Reserve of the Supreme High Command in March and briefly to Western Front reserves before being assigned to 50th Army in that front on April 11. The 146th continued to serve in this small army's relatively quiet sector until March 1943. In that month, the division was on the right flank of its army during the Third Rzhev–Sychevka Offensive Operation, following up the withdrawal of German 9th Army from the Rzhev Salient. Following this it was transferred to the adjacent 49th Army for a larger-scale offensive towards Spas-Demensk, but this was suspended by April 1. In the aftermath, the division returned to the Reserve of the Supreme High Command for rebuilding.

In the Baltic Fronts 
After a lengthy stay in reserve, the 146th was reassigned to the 3rd Shock Army in 2nd Baltic Front in October. It would remain in this army until March 1944, when it would be moved to the 14th Guards Rifle Corps of 1st Shock Army in the same front. In early July the division, in the same corps and army, was reassigned to the new 3rd Baltic Front. As the Soviet summer offensive began, the division was facing the German Panther line, directly south of the city of Ostrov. During the following fighting, the 146th Rifle Division was given credit for the liberation of Ostrov, and received its name as an honorific.

In October the division, still in the 14th Guards Rifle Corps, was moved back to 3rd Shock Army, where the division would remain for the duration. While most rifle divisions were receiving larger, more powerful guns in their antitank battalions, the 146th continued to use their 45mm pieces, as there was little scope for armor operations in its sector of the front. Prior to the Vistula-Oder Operation in early January 1945, 3rd Shock Army was moved to the 1st Belorussian Front, and the 146th joined the 7th Rifle Corps, where it would remain until postwar.

Advance 
During the late stages of the Battle of Berlin, the division, with its corps, provided flank support to the 79th Rifle Corps as it fought its way across the Moltke Bridge to capture the Reichstag. The soldiers of the 146th ended the war with the official title of 146th Rifle, Ostrov, Order of the Red Banner, Order of Suvorov, Order of Kutuzov Division. (Russian: 146-я стрелковая Островская Краснознамённая орденов Суворова и Кутузова дивизия.)

Postwar 
After the war, the division continued to serve in the 3rd Shock Army, Group of Soviet Forces in Germany. In February 1946 it was sent to the Kiev Military District and disbanded there in June 1946.

In 1954, it reformed from the 10th Machine Gun Artillery Division at Poltavka with the 25th Army in the Far Eastern Military District.  The division was disbanded on July 25, 1956.

References

Citations

Bibliography

 pp. 172-73

146
Military units and formations established in 1939
Military units and formations disestablished in 1946
Military units and formations awarded the Order of the Red Banner